Aurangnagar is a village in Bhiwani district of the Indian state of Haryana. , the village had 62 households with a population of 387 of which 214 were male and 173 female.

References

Villages in Bhiwani district